Kheti or Khety was an Ancient Egyptian name, borne by pharaohs and other nobility.

The name may refer to:

Pharaohs of the 9th or 10th Dynasty
 Meryibre Khety, a pharaoh of the First Intermediate Period
 Nebkaure Khety, a pharaoh of the First Intermediate Period
 Wahkare Khety, a pharaoh of the First Intermediate Period
 Khety III, purported author of the Teaching for King Merykara, a treatise on kingship

Nobles
 Khety I (nomarch), in Asyut during the 9th or 10th Dynasty
 Khety II (nomarch), in Asyut during the 10th Dynasty and grandson of Khety I
 Khety (BH17), nomarch in Men'at Khufu during the 11th Dynasty, buried in Beni Hasan
 Kheti (treasurer), during the 11th Dynasty
 Kheti, vizier famous for his impartiality, mentioned in the Installation of the Vizier and possibly to be identified with the one below
 Kheti (vizier),  1800 BC, under Amenemhat III of the Twelfth Dynasty, mentioned in a papyrus found at Lahun
 Kheti, or Dua-Kheti, author of The Satire of the Trades

Ancient Egyptian given names